Will Rogers (1879–1935) was an American humorist.

Will Rogers may also refer to:

People
 Will Rogers (American football) (born 2001), American football quarterback
 Will Rogers (Maine politician) (born 1938), American realtor and politician from Maine
 Will Rogers (Oklahoma politician) (1898–1983), Congressman and politician from Oklahoma
 Will Rogers (trade unionist) (died 1952), British trade unionist and politician
 Will Rogers Jr. (1911–1993), US Representative from California

Other uses
 USS Will Rogers (SSBN-659), a nuclear submarine
 Will Rogers State Historic Park, Los Angeles, California
 Will Rogers World Airport, Oklahoma
 Will Rogers Gardens, Oklahoma City, Oklahoma
 Will Rogers (Davidson), a statue created by Jo Davidson

Rogers, Will